Yelena Gadzhievna Isinbayeva (born 3 June 1982) is a Russian former pole vaulter. She is a two-time Olympic gold medalist (2004 and 2008), a three-time World Champion (2005, 2007 and 2013), the world record holder in the event, and is widely considered the greatest female pole-vaulter of all time. 
Isinbayeva was banned from the 2016 Rio Olympics after revelations of an extensive state-sponsored doping programme in Russia, thus dashing her hopes of a grand retirement winning the Olympic gold medal. She retired from athletics in August 2016 after being elected to serve an 8-year term on the IOC's Athletes' Commission.

Isinbayeva has been a major champion on nine occasions (Olympic, World outdoor and indoor champion and European outdoor and indoor champion). She was also the jackpot winner of the IAAF Golden League series in 2007 and 2009. After poor performances at the world championships in 2009 and 2010, she took a year-long break from the sport.

She became the first woman to clear the five-metre barrier in 2005. Her existing world record is 5.06 m outdoors, set in Zurich in August 2009. Her 5.01 m indoors was the world record for just over a year. The latter was Isinbayeva's twenty-eighth pole vault world record.

Isinbayeva was named Female Athlete of the Year by the IAAF in 2004, 2005 and 2008, and World Sportswoman of the Year by Laureus in 2007 and 2009. In 2007 she entered in the FICTS "Hall of Fame" and was awarded with "Excellence Guirlande D'Honneur". She was given the Prince of Asturias Award for Sports in 2009. She is one of only ten athletes (along with Valerie Adams, Usain Bolt, Veronica Campbell-Brown, Jacques Freitag, Kirani James, Jana Pittman, Dani Samuels, David Storl and Faith Kipyegon) to win world championships at the youth, junior, and senior level of an athletic event.

Career

Early life and competition
Born to a Tabasaran father and a Russian mother in Volgograd, Isinbayeva trained as a gymnast from the age of 5 to 15.

Six months after having taken up pole-vaulting she won her first major victory at age 16 during the 1998 World Youth Games in Moscow, Russia with a height of 4.00 m. It was her third athletic competition. She jumped the same height at the 1998 World Junior Championships in Athletics in Annecy, France, but this left her 10 cm away from the medal placings.

In 1999, Isinbayeva improved on this height at the 1999 World Youth Championships in Athletics in Bydgoszcz, Poland when she cleared 4.10 m to take her second gold medal.

At the 2000 World Junior Championships in Athletics Isinbayeva again took first place clearing 4.20 m ahead of German Annika Becker. The same year the women's pole vault made its debut as an Olympic event in Sydney, Australia where Stacy Dragila of the United States took gold. In the same event Isinbayeva did not make it out of the qualifying round.

She won another gold medal in 2001, this time at the European Junior Championships with a winning height of 4.40 m.

Isinbayeva continued to improve and 2002 saw her clear 4.55 m at the 2002 European Athletics Championships, where she gained her first senior championship medal (silver), finishing 5 cm short of her compatriot Svetlana Feofanova.

First world records and Olympic title
2003 was another year of progression and saw Isinbayeva win the European Under 23 Championships gold with 4.65 m (in Bydgoszcz). On 13 July 2003, just about a month after her 21st birthday, Isinbayeva set her first world record at a meeting in Gateshead, England with a height of 4.82 m, which had made her the favourite to take gold at the 2003 World Championships in Athletics the following month. She ended up winning the bronze medal with Feofanova taking gold and Becker the silver.

At a meeting at Donetsk, Ukraine, Isinbayeva set a new indoor world record, with a height of 4.83 m only to see Feofanova increase this by two centimetres the following week. The following month at the Worlds Indoor Championships in March Isinbayeva broke Feofanova's record with a gold medal-winning jump of 4.86 m beating reigning indoor & outdoor champion Feofanova into bronze with reigning Olympic champion Dragila taking silver. The IAAF considered all three records to be over-all (outdoor) records, hence the indoor and outdoor records now stood at 4.86 m

27 June saw Isinbayeva return to Gateshead and improved the world record to 4.87 m. Feofanova responded the following week by breaking the record by a centimetre in Heraklion, Greece.

On 25 July in Birmingham, England, Isinbayeva reclaimed the record jumping 4.89 m and five days later in Crystal Palace, London, added a further centimetre to the record.

At the 2004 Summer Olympics in Athens, Isinbayeva won gold medal with a new world record height of 4.91 m. She subsequently broke the record later that year at the Memorial Van Damme in Brussels with a 4.92 m jump, her eighth world record of the season. Isinbayeva was named World Athlete of the Year for winning the Olympic & World Indoor title and breaking the World record eight times.

World and European champion
At the European Indoor Championships in Madrid, Spain Isinbayeva won gold with a new indoor world record of 4.90 m. In July 2005, Isinbayeva broke the world record four times over three separate meetings. First in Lausanne, Switzerland, she added an extra centimetre to her own mark clearing 4.93 m. It was the 14th world record of Isinbayeva's career coming just three months after she broke her own indoor mark (4.89 m) in Lievin. Eleven days later, in Madrid, Spain, she added an additional 2 cm to clear 4.95 m. In Crystal Palace, London on 22 July, after improving the record to 4.96 m, she raised the bar to 5.00 m. She then became the first woman in history to clear the once mythical five-metre barrier in pole vaulting, achieving the monumental mark with a single attempt.

After the women's pole vault final at the 2005 World Championships in Helsinki, Finland was delayed due to extremely bad weather conditions, Isinbayeva once again broke her own world record, performing 5.01 m in her second attempt, and winning the competition with a 41 cm margin of victory, which was the greatest margin ever obtained in any World or Olympic competition for the event. This was already the eighteenth world record in the career of the then 23-year-old Isinbayeva and her successful season was crowned with her second consecutive World Athlete of the Year award.

At an indoor meeting on 12 February in Donetsk, Ukraine, Isinbayeva set a new indoor world record. She cleared 4.91 m. In March she successfully defended her World Indoor title in front of a homeland crowd in Moscow, Russia. During the 2006 European Athletics Championships in Gothenburg she won the gold medal with a CR of 4.80 metres. This was the only gold medal missing from her collection until that time. In September she won the World Cup, representing Russia, in Athens.

Isinbayeva was crowned Laureus World Sports Woman of the Year for the 2006 season.

Second world and Olympic golds
On 10 February 2007 in Donetsk, Ukraine, Isinbayeva broke the world indoor pole vault record again, by clearing 4.93 metres. It was Isinbayeva's 20th world record.

On 28 August 2007 Isinbayeva repeated as world champion in Osaka at the 2007 World Championships in Athletics with a 4.80 m performance, then failed three times at setting a new world record at 5.02 m. Her competition did no better than 4.75 m.

In 2007, she also won the IAAF Golden League Jackpot (which she shared with Sanya Richards) after having won all 2007 IAAF Golden League meetings.
Isinbayeva was unbeaten in the 2007 season and won 18 out of 18 competitions.

During the indoor 2008 season, Isinbayeva set her twenty-first world record, clearing 4.95 metres on 16 February 2008 in Donetsk, Ukraine. A few weeks later, in Valencia, Spain, Isinbayeva won the World Indoor Championships over Jennifer Stuczynski. It was Isinbayeva's third consecutive World Indoor title.

On 11 July, at her first outdoor competition of the season, Rome's Golden Gala, Isinbayeva broke her own world record, clearing 5.03 metres. This was her first world record outdoors since the 2005 World Championships. Isinbayeva stated that she had tried 5.02 metres so many times unsuccessfully that her coach told her to change something and so she attempted 5.03 metres. This record came just as people began to speculate her fall from the top of pole vaulting, as American Jennifer Stuczynski cleared 4.92 metres at the American Olympic Trials. Isinbayeva stated that this motivated her to maintain her reputation as the world's greatest female pole vaulter. A few weeks later, at the Aviva London Grand Prix, Isinbayeva and Stuczynski competed together for the first time of the outdoor season. Isinbayeva won the competition, with Stuczynski finishing second. Both attempted a new world record of 5.04 metres. Isinbayeva was tantalizingly close on her final attempt, with the bar falling only after Isinbayeva had landed on the mat.

She successfully cleared that height on 29 July, in Monte Carlo, Monaco, her twenty-third world record.

At the 2008 Summer Olympics in Beijing on 18 August, Isinbayeva needed two vaults to prolong her Olympic title reign and went on to finish the competition with 5.05m, a world record at the time, her 24th world record.

On 23 November in Monaco, she was selected World Athlete of the Year by the IAAF for the third time in her career, along with Jamaican male sprinter Usain Bolt.

Break and return

Isinbayeva started the 2009 season by becoming the first woman to vault over 5 metres indoors. She first raised her world indoor mark with a vault of 4.97 m, then raised the bar to 5.00 m and cleared that height as well. The two marks were set at the Pole Vault Stars indoor meet, on 15 February, in Donetsk, Ukraine. It was the sixth consecutive year she had set an indoor world record in this meet. She received the Laureus World Sports Award for Sportswoman of the Year in recognition of her achievements – it was also the fifth time she had been nominated for the award in as many years.

At the 2009 World Championships in Berlin, Germany, Isinbayeva lost her second competition of the year after failing to achieve a successful vault. The world champion was Anna Rogowska who also beat her in the London Athletics Grand Prix in May. However, Yelena Isinbayeva broke her own women's pole vault world record at the Weltklasse Golden League meeting by clearing 5.06 m. On 2 September she was given the 2009 Prince of Asturias Award for Sports.

She hoped to put her World Championships no-mark performance behind her by aiming for a world indoor record at the 2010 IAAF World Indoor Championships. The Russian cleared her opening height of 4.60 m at the championships in Doha, but she faltered at 4.75 m and she ended up in fourth place and outside of the medals for a second consecutive time. Following another disappointment at a major championships, she decided to take time out from the sport to recuperate, saying: "A break from competing is absolutely necessary for me. After more than eight years of very hard training and competing at the highest levels both indoors and outdoors each year I need to step back in order for my body to properly recover".

She missed the opportunity to defend her title at the 2010 European Championships and she was succeeded by her compatriot Svetlana Feofanova, while Fabiana Murer went on to claim the inaugural Diamond League pole vault series. Isinbayeva continued to train with Vitaliy Petrov during her time out, however, although did not appear in competition until the start of the 2011 indoor season. The Russian Winter Meeting in February 2011 was the venue for her comeback and she demonstrated her resurgence of form with a first time clearance of 4.81 m, comfortably defeating Feofanava.

In March 2011, Isinbayeva left her coach Vitaly Petrov and returned to her former mentor Yevgeny Trofimov, who had coached her since the age of 15 and until 2005. During the 2011 summer season she participated in only a few competitions and on 29 July she won the 2011 Diamond League meeting in Stockholm with a season best of 4.76 m. However, in the World Championships in Daegu she ended up again outside of the medals, taking the sixth place with 4.65 m.

She began 2012 with a clearance of 4.70 m at the Governor's Cup in Volgograd. At the 2012 Olympic Games, she easily qualified for the finals, where she came third with 4.70 m. She considered the bronze medal a success but mentioned that she would like to retire as acting Olympic champion. During the London Games she caused surprise and amusement in Britain when she was reported to have told Russian TV that the people of the UK were not interested in the Olympic Games and many Londoners were not even aware they were happening in their city.

In 2016, during the Russian nationals, she posted the world leading jump of 4.90 m following a ban of Russian track and field from the Olympics. The ban prevented her from taking part in the Rio Olympics, but she was elected to serve an 8-year term on the IOC's Athletes' Commission, after which she announced her retirement from athletics.

In December 2016, Isinbayeva became the chair of the supervisory board of the Russian Anti-Doping Agency.

Views 
After the Court of Arbitration for Sport turned down an appeal by Russian athletes, Isinbayeva wrote, "Let all those pseudo clean foreign athletes breathe a sigh of relief and win their pseudo gold medals in our absence. They always did fear strength." She called for whistleblower Yuliya Stepanova to be "banned for life".

After she became chair of the Russian Anti-Doping Agency's supervisory board, IAAF taskforce chair Rune Andersen stated, "It is difficult to see how this helps to achieve the desired change in culture in track and field, or how it helps to promote an open environment for Russian whistleblowers", noting that Isinbayeva had called a WADA report "groundless" without reading it, publicly criticised whistleblowers (Andrei Dmitriev, Yuliya Stepanova, and Vitaliy Stepanov), and had not signed a pledge for clean sport or endorsed a Russian anti-doping group.

Personal life

Her father, Gadzhi Gadzhiyevich Isinbayev, is a Tabasaran plumber while her mother, a shop assistant, is Russian. Isinbayeva also has a sister named Inna. Isinbayeva came from humble beginnings and remembers that her parents had to make many financial sacrifices in her early career.

She has both a Bachelor's and Master's Degree after graduating from the Volgograd State Academy of Physical Culture. Currently she is continuing her post-graduate studies there and also studying at the Donetsk National Technical University.

In the Russian club competitions she represents the railroad military team; she is formally an officer in the Russian army, and on 4 August 2005 she was given the military rank of senior lieutenant before being promoted to captain in August 2008.

She features in Toshiba ads promoting their entire product line in Russia. She also appears in a Lady's Speed Stick advertisement in Russia.

On 2 December 2010 she gave a speech before the FIFA delegates in Zürich. Later on that occasion it was announced that Russia will host the 2018 FIFA World Cup.

Yelena Isinbayeva is now a member of the 'Champions for Peace' club, a group of 54 famous elite athletes committed to serving peace in the world through sport, created by Peace and Sport, a Monaco-based international organization.

On 15 August 2013, Isinbayeva courted controversy by condemning homosexuality, criticizing athletes for supporting LGBT rights and coming out in favour of a law banning "homosexual propaganda that targets children" in Russia which had drawn sharp criticism from some representatives of the international community and had led activists to call for a boycott of the 2014 Winter Olympics in the Russian resort of Sochi, calling foreign athletes to "respect Russian traditions". Isinbayeva was an ambassador for the games and welcomed athletes as a "mayor" of the Olympic Village at Sochi. She later released a statement through the IAAF, athletics' world governing body, saying that she was "misunderstood" due to poor English.
Earlier, Isinbayeva had made critical remarks in response to a gesture made by the Swedish high-jumper Emma Green Tregaro and others who had painted their fingernails in rainbow colours as an expression of support for gays and lesbians in Russia and in protest against recently passed laws banning what the Russian government describe as propaganda for nontraditional sexual relations directed at minors. The Swedish Olympic Committee subsequently cautioned their athletes against engaging in the same type of manifestations at the Sochi Olympics.

On 7 February 2014, Isinbayeva, while pregnant, was one of the final torch bearers for the 2014 Winter Olympics opening ceremony. She has one child, Eva, born 28 June 2014. She married Eva's father, javelin thrower Nikita Petinov (b. 1990) shortly before their daughter's birth and had a wedding celebration on 12 December 2014.

International competitions

Results

2004
 1st – 4.83 m – Pole Vault Stars, Donetsk, Ukraine
 1st – 4.86 m – World Indoor Championships, Budapest, Hungary (WR)
 1st – 4.87 m – IAAF Gateshead, Great Britain (WR)
 1st – 4.89 m – Birmingham International Meeting, Great Britain (WR)
 1st – 4.90 m – British Grand Prix London, Great Britain (WR)
 1st – 4.91 m – Summer Olympics, Athens, Greece (WR)
 1st – 4.92 m – Golden League Brussels, Belgium (WR)
 1st – 4.83 m – 2nd World Athletics Final, Monte Carlo, Monaco

2005
 1st – 4.87 m – Pole Vault Stars, Donetsk, Ukraine
 1st – 4.90 m – European Indoor Championships, Madrid, Spain
 1st – 4.93 m – IAAF Lausanne, Switzerland (WR)
 1st – 4.95 m – Meeting de Madrid, Spain (WR)
 1st – 5.00 m – IAAF London, Great Britain (WR)
 1st – 4.79 m – IAAF Stockholm, Sweden
 1st – 5.01 m – World Championships, Helsinki, Finland (WR)
 1st – 4.93 m – Golden League Brussels, Belgium
 1st – 4.74 m – 3rd World Athletics Final, Monte Carlo, Monaco

2006
 1st – 4.91 m – Pole Vault Stars, Donetsk, Ukraine (iWR)
 1st – 4.79 m – Norwich Union Grand Prix, Birmingham, Great Britain
 1st – 4.72 m – Meeting Gaz de France du Pas-de-Calais, Lievin, France
 1st – 4.80 m – World Indoor Championships, Moscow, Russia
 1st – 4.76 m – IAAF Paris Saint-Denis, France
 1st – 4.90 m – IAAF Lausanne, Switzerland
 1st – 4.91 m – IAAF London, Great Britain
 1st – 4.80 m – European Championships, Gothenburg, Sweden
 1st – 4.81 m – Golden League Brussels, Belgium
 1st – 4.75 m – 4th World Athletics Final, Stuttgart, Germany

2007
 1st – 4.93 m – Pole Vault Stars, Donetsk, Ukraine (iWR)
 1st – 4.91 m – Meeting Gaz De France, Paris, France 
 1st – 4.90 m – Golden League Rome, Italy
 1st – 4.82 m – Norwich Union Super Grand Prix, London, Great Britain
 1st – 4.80 m – World Championships, Osaka, Japan
 1st – Golden League Brussels, Belgium
 1st – 4.87 m – 5th World Athletics Final, Stuttgart, Germany

2008
 1st – 4.95 m – Pole Vault Stars, Donetsk, Ukraine (iWR)
 1st – 4.75 m – World Indoor Championships, Valencia, Spain
 1st – 5.03 m – Golden Gala, Rome, Italy (WR)
 1st – 5.04 m – Super Grand Prix, Monte Carlo, Monaco (WR)
 1st – 5.05 m – Summer Olympics, Beijing, China (WR)
 1st – 4.88 m – IAAF Zurich, Switzerland

2009
 1st – 5.00 m – Pole Vault Stars, Donetsk, Ukraine (iWR)
 1st – 4.82 m – Aviva Grand Prix, Birmingham, Great Britain
 1st – 4.83 m – ISATF Berlin, Germany
 1st – 4.65 m – Meeting Gaz de France, Paris, France
 2nd – 4.68 m – Aviva London Grand Prix, London, Great Britain
 no height recorded – World Championships, Berlin, Germany
 1st – 5.06 m – IAAF Golden League, Zurich, Switzerland (WR)

2010
 1st – 4.85 m – Russian Winter Meeting, Moscow, Russia
 1st – 4.85 m – Pole Vault Stars, Donetsk, Ukraine
 4th – 4.60 m – World Indoor Championships, Doha, Qatar

2011
 1st – 4.81 m – Russian Winter Meeting, Moscow, Russia
 1st – 4.85 m – Pole Vault Stars, Donetsk, Ukraine
 1st – 4.60 m – Night of Athletics, Heusden, Belgium
 1st – 4.76 m – Diamond League, Stockholm, Sweden
 6th – 4.65 m – World Championships, Daegu, South Korea

2012
 1st – 5.01 m – XL-Galan, Stockholm, Sweden (iWR)
 1st – 4.80 m – World Indoor Championships, Istanbul, Turkey
 3rd – 4.70 m – Summer Olympic, London, Great Britain

2013
 1st – 4.78 m – Ostrava Meeting, Ostrava, Czech Republic
 1st – 4.75 m – Russian National Championship, Moscow, Russia
 1st – 4.89 m – World Championships, Moscow, Russia

2016
 1st – 4.90 m – Russian National Championship, Cheboksary, Russia

World record progression by Isinbayeva

Yelena Isinbayeva has set 17 world records and 13 indoor world records. Several of her indoor world records were also ratified as world records.

Records list
(Records in bold are current ones.)

See also
List of Olympic medalists in athletics (women)
List of 2004 Summer Olympics medal winners
List of 2008 Summer Olympics medal winners
List of 2012 Summer Olympics medal winners
List of World Athletics Championships medalists (women)
List of IAAF World Indoor Championships medalists (women)
List of European Athletics Championships medalists (women)
List of European Athletics Indoor Championships medalists (women)
List of pole vault national champions (women)
List of members of the International Olympic Committee
List of 2009 all-decade Sports Illustrated awards and honors
List of Russian people
List of Russian sportspeople
List of people from Volgograd
List of sportswomen
Pole vault at the Olympics
Pole vault at the World Championships in Athletics

References

External links

Flotrack.com Video Interview of Yelena Isinbayeva during the 100th Millrose Games
Yelena Isinbayeva at the Forbes

1982 births
Living people
Sportspeople from Volgograd
Russian female pole vaulters
International Olympic Committee members
Olympic female pole vaulters
Olympic athletes of Russia
Olympic gold medalists for Russia
Olympic bronze medalists for Russia
Olympic gold medalists in athletics (track and field)
Olympic bronze medalists in athletics (track and field)
Athletes (track and field) at the 2000 Summer Olympics
Athletes (track and field) at the 2004 Summer Olympics
Athletes (track and field) at the 2008 Summer Olympics
Athletes (track and field) at the 2012 Summer Olympics
Medalists at the 2004 Summer Olympics
Medalists at the 2008 Summer Olympics
Medalists at the 2012 Summer Olympics
World Athletics Championships athletes for Russia
World Athletics Championships medalists
World Athletics Championships winners
World Athletics Indoor Championships winners
World Athletics U20 Championships winners
World Youth Championships in Athletics winners
IAAF Continental Cup winners
European Athletics Championships winners
European Athletics Championships medalists
European Athletics Indoor Championships winners
Russian Athletics Championships winners
IAAF World Athletics Final winners
IAAF Golden League winners
World record setters in athletics (track and field)
World Athletics record holders
European Athlete of the Year winners
Laureus World Sports Awards winners
Track & Field News Athlete of the Year winners
Tabasaran people